CWTS may refer to:

 NASCAR Camping World Truck Series, a pickup truck racing series in the United States
 Civic Welfare Training Service, a component of the National Service Training Program of the Philippines
 CWTS Leiden Ranking, an annual global university ranking
 Centre for Science and Technology Studies (CWTS), a research center located at Leiden University in the Netherlands
 Cold Weather Testing Station, a stage in the development of the Canadian turbojet Avro Canada Chinook
 China Wireless Telecommunication Standards working Group (CWTS), part of the Standardization Administration of China
 Civil War Token Society, an organization involved in collecting Exonumia
 Christian Workers Training School, a precursor to Bacolod Christian College of Negros in the Philippines

See also 
 CWT (disambiguation)